Cyclophora pepira is a moth in the family Geometridae. It is found on Peninsular Malaysia and Borneo.

The wings are uniform brick red, with a discal spot in the form of point on the forewing. There is a white discal spot on the hindwing.

References

Moths described in 1938
pepira
Moths of Asia